Plusquellec is a commune in the Côtes-d'Armor department of Brittany, in northwestern France.

Population

Inhabitants of Plusquellec are called plusquellecois in French.

See also
 Brittany (administrative region) 
Communes of the Côtes-d'Armor department
Listing of the works of the atelier of the Maître de Tronoën

References

External links

Website of Joseph Lohou on Plusquellec 
Callac-Argoat website 

Communes of Côtes-d'Armor